Lecithocera turcica is a moth in the family Lecithoceridae. It was described by László Anthony Gozmány and Wolfram Mey in 2005. It is found in Turkey.

References

Moths described in 2005
turcica